The National Alpine Museum of Australia is at Mount Buller, Victoria, Australia at the Mt Buller Community Centre, formerly the campus of La Trobe University. It is "a non-profit; membership supported Museum dedicated to collecting, preserving, and exhibiting elements from the broad spectrum of ski history for the purpose of research, education, and entertainment". It showcases a collection of ski memorabilia covering the evolution of alpine activities in Australia.

See also

References

External links
 Official website

Sports museums in Australia
Museums in Victoria (Australia)
Skiing in Australia